Xenorhynchia is a genus of parasitic flies in the family Tachinidae. There are at least two described species in Xenorhynchia.

Species
These two species belong to the genus Xenorhynchia:
 Xenorhynchia orasus (Walker, 1849)
 Xenorhynchia peeli Malloch, 1938

References

Further reading

 
 
 
 

Tachinidae
Articles created by Qbugbot